Galimi is a surname. Notable people with the surname include:

Félix Galimi (1921–2005), Argentine fencer
Fulvio Galimi (1927–2016), Argentine fencer

See also
Halimi